is a Japanese entrepreneur who founded Mixi, a social networking site. He is ranked as the 37th richest Japanese person.

Timeline

1997: (21 years old)
 Created the job information website Find Job!.

1999: (23 years old)
 Founded eMercury Inc.

2004: (28 years old)
 Launched the Social network service Mixi.

2008: (32 years old)
 He climbed onto 37th of Japan's 40 Richest. Forbes reported Kasahara as having $740 million.

2015: (39 years old)
 He launched FamilyAlbum, a Private Family Photo-Sharing App.

References

External links
 Interview by CNN
 Brand NEW!!!

Living people
Japanese businesspeople
People from Minoh, Osaka
Year of birth missing (living people)